Samuel Taylor (born 23 December 2003) is an English professional footballer who plays as a forward for  club Tranmere Rovers.

Career
Taylor signed his first professional contract with Tranmere Rovers in January 2022, having scored eleven goals in half-a-season for the under-18 team. He made his first-team  debut at Prenton Park on 4 October, in a 5–3 defeat to Leeds United U23 in the EFL Trophy.

Career statistics

References

2003 births
Living people
English footballers
Association football forwards
Tranmere Rovers F.C. players
English Football League players